Railway stations in Djibouti are served by standard gauge railways of the Djiboutian Railway Company.

Metre gauge railway 

The metre gauge Ethio-Djibouti Railway once connected Addis Ababa to the port city of Djibouti.  The operating company that was known as the Ethio-Djibouti Railways built the railway between 1894 and 1917 to connect the Ethiopian capital city to French Somaliland. During early operations, it provided landlocked Ethiopia with its only access to the sea. After World War II, the railway progressively fell into a state of disrepair due to competition from road transport.

The railway has been mostly superseded by the Addis Ababa–Djibouti Railway, an electrified standard gauge railway that was completed in 2017. The metre gauge railway has been abandoned in central Ethiopia and Djibouti. However, a rehabilitated section is still in operation near the Ethiopia-Djibouti border. As of February 2018, a combined passenger and freight service runs two times a week between the Ethiopian city of Dire Dawa and the Djibouti border, stopping at Dewele (passengers) and Guelile (freight). Plans were announced in 2018 to rehabilitate track from Dire Dawa to Mieso.

List of railway stations

Passenger railway stations 
The stations below are passenger railway stations on operational railways.

Other stations

Gauge
 Existing lines are  gauge.
 Proposed lines are to be  gauge.

Proposed lines
A new line from Ethiopia will serve the port of Tadjourah which lies on the opposite (northern) shore of the Gulf of Tadjourah.

In 2013, CCECC of China is to build a new line from a container harbour at the Port of Doraleh to the Ethiopian border (near Ali Sabieh), on the way to Ethiopia. The new line junctions at Dewale.

See also
 Transport in Djibouti
 Railway stations in Ethiopia
 Lamu Port and Lamu-Southern Sudan-Ethiopia Transport Corridor

References

External links
 UN Map
 UNHCR Map

 
Railway stations
Railway stations